Grohs is a German surname. Notable people with the surname include:

Harald Grohs (born 1944), German race driver and team owner
Herbert Grohs (1931–2018), Austrian footballer

See also
Groh

German-language surnames